Desaturation may refer to:
 In pulse oximetry, the condition of a low blood oxygen concentration
 Reduction of colorfulness in image processing
 Conversion of a saturated compound into an unsaturated compound by a removal of two hydrogen molecules and the creation of a double bond